The Cincinnati Kelly's Killers were a Major League Baseball franchise based in Cincinnati.  The team existed for one season, and played in the American Association (AA).  The team played their home games at East End Park.

The majority owner of the club was Chris von der Ahe, who also owned the St. Louis Browns of the American Association, and they were managed by King Kelly.  In mid-August with the season incomplete, while the club was playing a series in St. Louis, von der Ahe was paid $12,000 by the National League's Cincinnati Reds to move the team out of the Cincinnati area.  The club was folded and replaced for the remainder of the 1891 season by the Milwaukee Brewers, who were brought in from the Western League.  Kelly's Killers had a win–loss record of 43–57.

Keys

List of players

See also
Cincinnati Kelly's Killers
1891 Cincinnati Kelly's Killers season

References

External links
Baseball Reference

Major League Baseball all-time rosters